Chlorine azide  is an inorganic compound that was discovered in 1908 by Friedrich Raschig. 
Concentrated  is notoriously unstable and may spontaneously detonate at any temperature.

Preparation and handling
Chlorine azide is prepared by passing chlorine gas over silver azide, or by an addition of acetic acid to a solution of sodium hypochlorite and sodium azide.

Explosive characteristics
Chlorine azide is extremely sensitive. It may explode, sometimes even without apparent provocation; it is thus too sensitive to be used commercially unless first diluted in solution. Chlorine azide reacts explosively with 1,3-butadiene, ethane, ethene, methane, propane, phosphorus, silver azide, and sodium. On contact with acid, chlorine azide decomposes, evolving toxic and corrosive hydrogen chloride gas.

Regulatory information
Its shipment is subject to strict reporting requirements and regulations by the US Department of Transportation.

References

External links

Azido compounds
Explosive chemicals
Explosive gases
Substances discovered in the 1900s
Chlorine compounds
Pseudohalogens